The Resistance (also known as the #Resistance) was an American liberal political movement that protested the presidency of Donald Trump, starting in November 2016. It later expanded to include not only Democrats, but Independents and Republicans who opposed Trump. Members have been described as prolific in their use of Twitter, especially the "#Resist" hashtag and, early on, #TheResistance. Some conservatives and Trump supporters have adopted the Resistance moniker to oppose President Joe Biden.

See also 

 Deep state in the United States
 I Am Part of the Resistance Inside the Trump Administration
 Never Trump movement
 Protests against Donald Trump

References

2016 United States presidential election
2017 establishments in the United States
Left-wing politics in the United States
Presidency of Donald Trump
Protests against results of elections